Prenzlau (formerly also Prenzlow) is a town in Brandenburg, Germany, the administrative seat of Uckermark District. It is also the centre of the historic Uckermark region.

Geography
Prenzlau station—which opened in 1863—is a stop on the Angermünde–Stralsund railway line.

History
Settled since Neolithic times, the Prenzlau area from the 7th century AD was the site of several gords erected by the Polabian Slavs. In the late 12th century, the Dukes of Pomerania had the region colonized by Low German settlers.

Prenzlau itself, named after Slavic Premyslaw, was first mentioned in 1187. It received town privileges by Duke Barnim I of Pomerania in 1234. When Duke Barnim signed the Treaty of Landin with the Ascanian margraves of Brandenburg in 1250, Prenzlau was already a fortified town with walls and moats, four parish churches and a monastery. Together with Berlin-Cölln, Frankfurt and Stendal, it ranked among the largest towns in the margraviate.

The Prenzlau and the Uckermark region were devastated during the Thirty Years' War. From the late 17th century onwards French Huguenot refugees settled here and an economic recovery started. Also a garrison town, Prenzlau was again ravaged by passing troops during the Seven Years' War and the Napoleonic Wars. In the mid 19th century, several citizens emigrated to Australia, where they founded the town of Prenzlau, Queensland west of Brisbane.

In World War II the Oflag II-A prisoner-of-war camp was located just south of Prenzlau on the main road to Berlin. The town centre was largely destroyed. The East German authorities had it rebuilt with large panel Plattenbau buildings.

Demography

Politics
Seats in the town's assembly (Stadtverordnetenversammlung) as of 2014 local elections: 
Christian Democratic Union (CDU): 7
Social Democratic Party of Germany (SPD): 7 
The Left: 6 
Bürgerfraktion (Independent): 4 
Wir Prenzlauer (Independent): 2 
Free Democratic Party (FDP): 1 
National Democratic Party of Germany (NPD): 1

Twin towns – sister cities

Prenzlau is twinned with:
 Barlinek, Poland
 Pokhvistnevo, Russia
 Uster, Switzerland
 Varėna, Lithuania

Notable people

 René Bielke (born 1962), ice hockey player
 Oscar Florianus Bluemner (1867–1938), American painter
 Wilhelm Grabow (1802–1874), civil servant, judge, and politician
 Jacob Philipp Hackert (1737–1807), landscape painter
 Frederika Louisa of Hesse-Darmstadt (1751–1805), queen consort of Prussia
 Louis I, Grand Duke of Hesse (1753–1830)
 Princess Amalie of Hesse-Darmstadt (1754–1832)
 Princess Wilhelmina Louisa of Hesse-Darmstadt (1755–1776)
 Paul Hirsch (1868–1940), politician
 Hans Felix Husadel (1897–1964), composer and conductor
 Otto Kaiser (born 1924), scholar
 Brigitte Rohde (born 1954), sprinter
 Max von Schenckendorff (1875-1943),  general in the Wehrmacht of Nazi Germany 
 Ernst Christian Friedrich Schering (1824–1889), apothecary and industrialist
 Johannes Schmidt (1843–1901), linguist
 Christian Friedrich Schwan (1733–1815), publisher and bookseller
 Adolf Wilhelm Theodor Stahr (1805–1876), writer and literary historian
 Christiane Wartenberg (born 1956), athlete
 Carola Zirzow (born 1954), sprint canoer

Gallery

References

External links

 Municipal website 

Localities in Uckermark (district)